The Italy national American football team, nicknamed the Blue Team is the national American football team for Italy. They have been successful, having won the European championship three times, and been runner up three times. They won the 2021 IFAF European Championship, its third European title, having also won in 1983 and 1985.

In response to the 2022 Russian invasion of Ukraine, the Italy national American football team announced that it refused to play against Russia in October 2022 in a qualifier for the 2023 IFAF European Championships.

IFAF World Championship record

References

External links
 FIDAF - Federazione Italiana di American Football

Italy
American Football
American football in Italy